This is a list of lighthouses in Solomon Islands.

Lighthouses

See also
 Lists of lighthouses and lightvessels

References

External links
 

Solomon Islands
Lighthouses
Lighthouses